Schwarzenegger may refer to:

Schwarzenegger (surname), famous people called Schwarzenegger
Perry v. Schwarzenegger, also known as Hollingsworth v. Perry and Perry v. Brown, a series of United States federal court cases that legalized same-sex marriage in the State of California
Arnold Schwarzenegger Classic, also known as Arnold Sports Festival, an annual multi-sport event consisting of professional bodybuilding (known specifically as Arnold Classic), strongman (also known as Arnold Strongman Classic), fitness, figure and bikini weekend expo